The 1980 German Open Championships was a men's tennis tournament played on outdoor clay courts at Am Rothenbaum in Hamburg, West Germany that was part of the Super Series of the 1980 Grand Prix circuit. It was the 72nd edition of the event and took place from 12 May until 18 May 1980. Second-seeded Harold Solomon won the singles title.

Finals

Singles
 Harold Solomon defeated  Guillermo Vilas, 6–7, 6–2, 6–4, 2–6, 6–3
 It was Solomon' 2nd singles title of the year and the 20th of his career.

Doubles
 Andrés Gómez /  Hans Gildemeister defeated  Reinhart Probst /  Max Wünschig, 6–3, 6–4

References

External links
   
 ATP tournament profile
 ITF tournament edition details

German Open
Hamburg European Open
1980 in West German sport